Ganesha Meendum Santhipom is a 2019 Tamil comedy film directed by Ratheesh Earate. Produced by Arun Vikraman Krishnan, the film features Prithvi Rajan and Oviya in the lead roles, while I. M. Vijayan, Singampuli, and Crane Manohar play supporting roles. The music was composed by NLB Siby, and the film released on 5 April 2019.

Plot 
The story revolves around a con artist named Solomon (Prithvi Rajan) who plays around with Keerthi (Oviya). She approaches Solomon, who pretends to be a local thug in Chennai, for avoiding her stalker. Solomon reaches Chennai after getting into trouble and being chased by the thug of Madurai, Katthari (I. M. Vijayan). The trouble starts when Solomon and his partner Famous Paandi (Singampuli) break Kattari's legacy motorcycle. The film evolves when Solomon is exposed in front of Keerthi and confronts Katthari's brother in Chennai.

Cast

Production 
The film's promotions cashed in on Oviya's popularity after she participated in Bigg Boss Tamil season 1.

Soundtrack 

The film is set with two songs, both composed by debutant music director Siby.

Reception 
Thinkal Menon of The Times of India opined that "The movie doesn't have anything which impresses the regular film buffs and starts testing one's patience after a few minutes into it". Gopinath Rajendran of Cinema Express wrote that "On the whole, the Prithvi Rajan-Oviyaa-starrer tries to do a lot but fails to be worth our time".

References 

2010s Tamil-language films
2019 films
2010s crime comedy-drama films
Indian crime comedy-drama films